The 2015–16 National Basketball League (Czech Republic) season was the 23rd season of the Czech NBL. The season started on October 10, 2015.

Regular season

Playoffs

Czech clubs in European competitions

Czech clubs in Regional competitions

References

External links
NBL official website 

Czech Republic
Basketball
National Basketball League (Czech Republic)